Beech Hill is a rural community of the Halifax Regional Municipality in the Canadian province of Nova Scotia. The community has a population of 23. It is home to a baseball field, located inside of Beech Hill Road Park.

References

Beech Hill on Destination Nova Scotia

Communities in Halifax, Nova Scotia